is an anime series based on the manga of the same title by Yoshiichi Akahito. The episodes also air on BS11, Chiba TV, KBS Kyoto, Sun TV, Tokyo MX, TV Aichi, TV Kanagawa and TV Saitama. A second season, subtitled , has been announced and began airing in Japan in January 2009. A series of Japanese DVDs, with each of them containing 4 episodes, will start being released on January 7, 2009.

The series is licensed for North American distribution and release by Funimation Entertainment. On October 24, 2008, the first thirteen episodes began airing online with English subtitles through Funimation's official YouTube, Joost, and Hulu channels, with higher end downloadable versions released on the company's own website.  Funimation noted that they hope this relatively quick release through online means will help prevent piracy. Additionally, according to the president of Funimation Entertainment Gen Fukunaga, "by the time a licensing deal is signed to bring a series from Japan to the U.S. the episodes are already available as illegal downloads."


Episode list

Shikabane Hime: Aka

Shikabane Hime: Kuro

References

External links
 Official Starchild Site 
 Official Gainax Site 
 Official Tokyo MX Site 
 
 
 

Corpse Princess